In baseball, an assist (denoted by A) is a defensive statistic, baseball being one of the few sports in which the defensive team controls the ball. An assist is credited to every defensive player who fields or touches the ball (after it has been hit by the batter) prior to the recording of a putout, even if the contact was unintentional. For example, if a ball strikes a player's leg and bounces off him to another fielder, who tags the baserunner, the first player is credited with an assist. A fielder can receive a maximum of one assist per out recorded. An assist is also credited if a putout would have occurred, had another fielder not committed an error. For example, a shortstop might field a ground ball cleanly, but the first baseman might drop his throw.  In this case, an error would be charged to the first baseman, and the shortstop would be credited with an assist.

Rabbit Maranville is the all-time leader with 8,967 career assists. Ozzie Smith (8,375), Cal Ripken Jr. (8,214), Bill Dahlen (8,138), Omar Vizquel (8,050), and Luis Aparicio (8,016) are the only other players to record more than 8,000 career assists.

Key

List

Stats updated as of the end of the 2022 season.

Notes

References

Baseball-Reference.com

Major League Baseball statistics
Assists leaders